Tisbury is a suburb of New Zealand's southernmost city, Invercargill.

The unsteady climate often affect crops in Tisbury. In 2015 the cold weather continued till Christmas and vegetable farmers were unable to yield crops in time.

Demographics

It had a population of 366 at the 2018 New Zealand census, a decrease of 36 people (−9.0%) since the 2013 census, and an increase of 9 people (2.5%) since the 2006 census. There were 141 households. There were 201 males and 162 females, giving a sex ratio of 1.24 males per female, with 66 people (18.0%) aged under 15 years, 48 (13.1%) aged 15 to 29, 201 (54.9%) aged 30 to 64, and 51 (13.9%) aged 65 or older.

Ethnicities were 91.0% European/Pākehā, 13.1% Māori, 0.8% Pacific peoples, and 4.1% Asian (totals add to more than 100% since people could identify with multiple ethnicities).

Although some people objected to giving their religion, 51.6% had no religion, 37.7% were Christian, 0.8% were Buddhist and 0.8% had other religions.

Of those at least 15 years old, 39 (13.0%) people had a bachelor or higher degree, and 75 (25.0%) people had no formal qualifications. The employment status of those at least 15 was that 159 (53.0%) people were employed full-time, 51 (17.0%) were part-time, and 6 (2.0%) were unemployed.

Kennington-Tisbury statistical area

Kennington-Tisbury had a population of 1,443 at the 2018 New Zealand census, an increase of 126 people (9.6%) since the 2013 census, and an increase of 351 people (32.1%) since the 2006 census. There were 528 households. There were 756 males and 687 females, giving a sex ratio of 1.1 males per female. The median age was 43.5 years (compared with 37.4 years nationally), with 306 people (21.2%) aged under 15 years, 189 (13.1%) aged 15 to 29, 723 (50.1%) aged 30 to 64, and 228 (15.8%) aged 65 or older.

Ethnicities were 92.7% European/Pākehā, 12.3% Māori, 0.8% Pacific peoples, 2.3% Asian, and 1.5% other ethnicities (totals add to more than 100% since people could identify with multiple ethnicities).

The proportion of people born overseas was 8.3%, compared with 27.1% nationally.

Although some people objected to giving their religion, 50.5% had no religion, 42.4% were Christian, 0.4% were Buddhist and 0.6% had other religions.

Of those at least 15 years old, 174 (15.3%) people had a bachelor or higher degree, and 252 (22.2%) people had no formal qualifications. The median income was $39,700, compared with $31,800 nationally. 234 people (20.6%) earned over $70,000 compared to 17.2% nationally. The employment status of those at least 15 was that 627 (55.1%) people were employed full-time, 207 (18.2%) were part-time, and 24 (2.1%) were unemployed.

Education
Tisbury School is a state school for years 1 to 6 with a roll of  students as of  The school was established in 1891, but it was destroyed by a fire in 1945 and the present classroom block was built to replace it.

References

Suburbs of Invercargill